The Aromanian language (or ), also known as Macedo-Romanian or Vlach, is an Eastern Romance language, similar to Megleno-Romanian, Istro-Romanian and Romanian, spoken in Southeastern Europe. Its speakers are called Aromanians or Vlachs (a broader term and an exonym in widespread use to define Romance communities in the Balkans). Some scholars, mostly Romanian ones, consider Aromanian a dialect of Romanian.

Aromanian shares many features with modern Romanian, including similar morphology and syntax, as well as a large common vocabulary inherited from Latin. An important source of dissimilarity between Romanian and Aromanian is the adstratum languages (external influences); whereas Romanian has been influenced to a greater extent by the Slavic languages, Aromanian has been more influenced by Greek, with which it has been in close contact throughout its history.

Geographic distribution 
Aromanian is native to Albania, Bulgaria, Greece, North Macedonia, Romania and Serbia. In 2018, it was estimated that Aromanian had 210,000 native speakers, of which 50,000 were in Albania, 50,000 in Greece, 50,000 in Romania, 32,000 in Serbia, 18,200 in Macedonia, and 9,800 in Bulgaria.

Official status 
Aromanian has a degree of official recognition in North Macedonia, where it is taught as a subject in some primary schools. In North Macedonia, Aromanian speakers also have the right to use the language in court proceedings. Since 2006, Aromanian has had the status of a second official municipal language in the city of Kruševo, the only place in the world where Aromanian has any kind of official status apart from general state recognition.

Apart from North Macedonia, the Aromanians are also recognized in Albania as a national minority.

History 

Aromanian, Daco-Romanian (Romanian), Istro-Romanian language, and Megleno-Romanian language are descendants of a proto-language called Common Romanian, itself descending from the Proto-Romance language. No later than the 10th century Common Romanian split into southern and northern dialects, and Aromanian and Romanian have developed differently from these two distinct dialects of the proto language over the course of the next one thousand years.

Greek influences are much stronger in Aromanian than in other Eastern Romance languages, especially because Aromanian has used Greek words to coin new words (neologisms), especially within Greece, while Romanian has based most of its neologisms on French. However, there has also been an increasing tendency for Aromanian-speakers outside of Greece to borrow terms from Romanian, due to the shared alphabet and contact with Romanian over the Internet, where Romanian-language material is much more available than it is in Aromanian.

With the arrival of the Turks in the Balkans, Aromanian also received some Turkish words. Still, the lexical composition remains mainly Romance.

Some of the earliest known documents in Aromanian are the Aromanian Missal and the Codex Dimonie.

Dialects 

Aromanian is not a homogenous linguistic entity. Its main varieties include the Pindus type, the Gramoste type, the Farsherot type, Olympus type, and the Moscopole type.

It has also several regional variants, named after places that were home to significant populations of Aromanians (Vlachs); nowadays located in Albania, North Macedonia and Greece. Examples are the Moscopole variant; the Muzachiar variant from Muzachia in central Albania; the variant of Bitola; Pilister, Malovište, Gopeš, Upper Beala; Gorna Belica near Struga, Krusevo, and the variant east of the Vardar river in North Macedonia.

An Aromanian dictionary currently under development can be found on wiktionary.

Standardization efforts 
The Aromanian language is not standardized. However, there have been some efforts to do so.

Phonology 

Aromanian exhibits several differences from standard Romanian in its phonology, some of which are probably due to influence from Greek or Albanian. Aromanian is usually written with a version of the Latin script with an orthography that resembles both that of Albanian (in the use of digraphs such as dh, sh, and th) and Italian (in its use of c and g), along with the letter ã, used for the sounds represented in Romanian by ă and â/î. It can also be written with a modified Romanian alphabet that includes two additional letters, ń and ľ, and rarely with a version of the Greek script.

Consonants 

 Central approximant consonants only occur as a result of a word-initial or intervocalic [] and [] when preceding another vowel.
//, // can have allophones as [], [] when preceding front vowels.
//, // are in free variation among different dialects.

Vowels 

 Two vowel sounds /, / are both represented by one grapheme; ã.

Orthography 
The Aromanian alphabet consists of 27 letters and 9 digraphs.

In addition, the digraph "gj" ( before "e" and "i") is used as well.

Grammar 

The grammar and morphology are very similar to those of other Romance languages:
 It has two grammatical numbers: singular and plural (no dual).
 It is a null-subject language.
 Verbs have many conjugations, including:
 A present tense, a preterite, an imperfect, a pluperfect and a future tense in the indicative mood, for statements of fact.
 An imperative mood, for direct commands.
 Three non-finite forms: infinitive, gerund, and past participle.
 Distinct active and passive voices, as well as an impersonal passive voice.
The Aromanian language has some exceptions from the Romance languages, some of which are shared with Romanian: the definite article is a clitic particle appended at the end of the word, both the definite and indefinite articles can be inflected, and nouns are classified in three genders, with neuter in addition to masculine and feminine.

Verbs 
Aromanian grammar has features that distinguish it from Romanian, an important one being the complete disappearance of verb infinitives, a feature of the Balkan sprachbund. As such, the tenses and moods that, in Romanian, use the infinitive (like the future simple tense and the conditional mood) are formed in other ways in Aromanian. For the same reason, verb entries in dictionaries are given in their indicative mood, present tense, first-person-singular form.

Aromanian verbs are classified in four conjugations. The table below gives some examples and indicates the conjugation of the corresponding verbs in Romanian.

Future tense 

The future tense is formed using an auxiliary invariable particle "u" or "va" and the subjunctive mood.

Pluperfect 

Whereas in Romanian the pluperfect (past perfect) is formed synthetically (as in literary Portuguese), Aromanian uses a periphrastic construction with the auxiliary verb am (have) as the imperfect (aviam) and the past participle, as in Spanish and French, except that French replaces avoir (have) with être (be) for some intransitive verbs. Aromanian shares this feature with Meglenian as well as other languages in the Balkan language area.

Only the auxiliary verb inflects according to number and person (aviam, aviai, avia, aviamu, aviatu, avia), whereas the past participle does not change.

Gerund 
The Aromanian gerund is applied to some verbs, but not all. These verbs are:
 1st conjugation: acatsã (acãtsãnd), portu, lucreadzã/lucreashce, adiljã/adiljeashce.
 2nd conjugation: armãnã, cade, poate, tatse, veade.
 3rd conjugation: arupã, dipune, dutse, dzãse, fatsi/featse, tradzi/tradze, scrie.
 4th conjugation: apire, doarme, hivrie, aure, pate, avde.

Current situation

Media 

The Macedonian Radio Television (Macedonian: Македонска радиотелевизија, transliteration: Makedonska radiotelevizija) (MRT) produces radio and television broadcasts in Aromanian.

Radio Romania International has Aromanian service producing radio shows in Aromanian.

Films produced in the Aromanian language include Toma Enache's I'm Not Famous but I'm Aromanian (2013), the first in Aromanian.

Situation in Greece

Even before the incorporation of various Aromanian-speaking territories into the Greek state (1832, 1912), the language was subordinated to Greek, traditionally the language of education and religion in Constantinople and other prosperous urban cities. The historical studies cited below (mostly Capidan) show that especially after the fall of Moscopole (1788) the process of Hellenisation via education and religion gained a strong impetus mostly among people doing business in the cities.

The Romanian state began opening schools for the Romanian-influenced Vlachs in the 1860s, but this initiative was regarded with suspicion by the Greeks, who thought that Romania was trying to assimilate them. 19th-century travellers in the Balkans such as W. M. Leake and Henry Fanshawe Tozer noted that Vlachs in the Pindus and Macedonia were bilingual, reserving the Latin dialect for inside the home.

By 1948, the new Soviet-imposed communist regime of Romania had closed all Romanian-run schools outside Romania and, since the closure, there has been no formal education in Aromanian and speakers have been encouraged to learn and use the Greek language. This has been a process encouraged by the community itself and is not an explicit State policy. The decline and isolation of the Romanian orientated groups was not helped by the fact that they openly collaborated with the Axis powers of Italy and Germany during the occupation of Greece in WWII. Notably, the vast majority of Vlachs fought in the Greek resistance and a number of their villages were destroyed by the Germans.

The issue of Aromanian-language education is a sensitive one, partly because of opposition within the Greek Vlachs community to actions leading to the introduction of the language into the education system, viewing it as an artificial distinction between them and other Greeks. For example, the former education minister, George Papandreou, received a negative response from Greek-Aromanian mayors and associations to his proposal for a trial Aromanian language education programme. The Panhellenic Federation of Cultural Associations of Vlachs expressed strong opposition to the Parliamentary Assembly of the Council of Europe's recommendation in 1997 that the tuition of Aromanian be supported so as to avoid its extinction. This recommendation was issued after pressure from the Union for Aromanian Language and Culture in Germany. On a visit to Metsovo, Epirus in 1998, Greek President Konstantinos Stephanopoulos called on Vlachs to speak and teach their language, but its decline continues.

A recent example of the sensitivity of the issue was the 2001 conviction (later overturned in the Appeals Court) to 15 months in jail of Sotiris Bletsas, a Greek Aromanian who was found guilty of "dissemination of false information" after he distributed informative material on minority languages in Europe (which included information on minority languages of Greece), produced by the European Bureau for Lesser Used Languages and financed by the European Commission. His conviction met with broad condemnation in Greece, where at least one editorial compared the situation to the suppression of Kurdish and other minority languages in Turkey and noted the irony that some prosecutors in fact came from non-Hellenophone families that had once spoken Aromanian or Turkish. Bletsas was eventually acquitted.

Language samples

Fãrshãrot 1

Fãrshãrot 2

Grãmushtean

 The Lord's Prayer – source

Universal Declaration of Human Rights 

Dina Cuvata translated Article 1 of the Universal Declaration of Human Rights as follows:

Comparison with Romanian 

The following text is given for comparison in Aromanian and in Romanian, with an English translation. The spelling of Aromanian is that decided at the Bitola Symposium of August 1997. The word choice in the Romanian version was such that it matches the Aromanian text, although in modern Romanian other words might have been more appropriate. The English translation is only provided as a guide to the meaning, with an attempt to keep the word order as close to the original as possible.

Common words and phrases

See also 

 Aromanian alphabet
 Common Romanian 
 Substrate in Romanian 
 Balkan sprachbund
 Origin of the Romanians
 Thraco-Roman 
 Daco-Roman 
 Eastern Romance languages
 Romance languages 
 Legacy of the Roman Empire
 Latin-Greek connection

References

Citations

Bibliography 

 Bara, Mariana. . Munich: Lincom Europa, 2004, 231 p.; .
 Bara, Mariana. Limba armănească: Vocabular şi stil. Bucharest: Editura Cartea Universitară, 2007, .
 Berciu-Drăghicescu, Adina; Petre, Maria. Şcoli şi Biserici româneşti din Peninsula Balcanică: Documente (1864–1948). Bucharest: Editura Universităţii, 2004.
 Capidan, Theodor. Aromânii, dialectul Aromân. Academia Română, Studii şi Cercetări, XX 1932.
Caragiu Marioțeanu, Matilda. Dicționar aromân (Macedo-vlah). Bucarest: Editura Enciclopedică, 1997.
 Friedman, Victor A. “The Vlah Minority in Macedonia: Language, Identity, Dialectology, and Standardization”, in Selected Papers in Slavic, Balkan, and Balkan Studies, eds. Juhani Nuoluoto, Martti Leiwo, & Jussi Halla-aho. Slavica Helsingiensa 21. University of Helsinki, 2001. online
 Gołąb, Zbigniew. The Arumanian Dialect of Kruševo, SR Macedonia. Skopje: MANU, 1984.
 
 Kahl, Thede. “Sprache und Intention der ersten aromunischen Textdokumente, 1731–1809”, in Festschrift für Gerhard Birkfellner zum 65. Geburtstag: Studia Philologica Slavica I/I, ed. Bernhard Symanzik. Münstersche Texte zur Slavistik, 2006, p. 245–266.
 Marangozis, John. An Introduction to Vlach Grammar. Munich: Lincom Europa, 2010.
 Markoviḱ, Marjan. Aromanskiot i makedonskiot govor od ohridsko-struškiot region: vo balkanski kontekst [Aromanian and Macedonian dialects of the Ohrid-Struga region: in Balkan context]. Skopje: Makedonska akademija na naukite i umetnostite, 2007.
 Pascu, Giorge. Dictionnaire étymologique macédoroumain, 2 vols. Iaşi: Cultura Naţionalâ, 1918.
 Rosetti, Alexandru. Istoria limbii române, 2 vols. Bucharest, 1965–1969.
 "The Little Prince" by Antoine de Saint-Exupéry in Aromanian. Njiclu amirārush. Translated by Maria Bara and Thede Kahl, .
 Vrabie, Emil. An English-Aromanian (Macedo-Romanian) Dictionary. University, Miss.; Stratford, CT: Romance monographs, 2000.
 Weigand, Gustav. Die Sprache der Olympo-Wallachen, nebst einer Einleitung über Land und Leute. Leipzig: Johann Ambrosius Barth, 1888.

External links 

 
Aromanian Language website
Στα Βλάχικα – In Vlach: A website about the Vlach language in Greece
Aromanian Swadesh list of basic vocabulary words (from Wiktionary's Swadesh list appendix)
Aromanian basic lexicon at the Global Lexicostatistical Database
Asterios Koukoudis: Studies on the Vlachs
Greek Helsinki Human Rights Organization: Aromanians (Vlachs) in Greece
Conjugation of verbs in Aromanian and Istro-Romanian 
Romanian and the Balkans, with some references to Aromanian
Greek Vlach website
Consiliul A Tinirlor Armanj – CTARM, webpage about Youth Aromanians and their projects
 Armans Association from Serbia
 Armans Cultural Association from Romania
 Η βλαχική γλώσσα στο γλώσσες και αλφάβητα του κόσμου
EVANGHELU PI DUPI LUKA (The Gospel according to Luke in Aromanian).

 
Languages of Albania
Languages of Bulgaria
Languages of Greece
Languages of North Macedonia
Languages of Romania
Languages of Serbia
Endangered Romance languages
Definitely endangered languages